Nethravathi railway station (Code: KZE) is a railway station serving Mangalore city, the second major city of Karnataka. Trains halting at the station connect this region to prominent cities in India such as Thiruvananthapuram, Kochi, Chennai, Kollam, Bangalore, Kozhikode, Coimbatore, Mysore  and so forth.

References

Railway stations in Dakshina Kannada district
Palakkad railway division